Farmen VIP is a celebrity version of the Swedish TV-series The Farm which is broadcast on TV4. This season will be broadcast from 19 March 2018. Paolo Roberto is the host as with earlier seasons of the regular series.

Celebrities 
 Yvonne Ryding
 Klara Svensson
 Sigrid Bergsåkra
 Patrik Sjöberg
 Glenn Hysen
 Felicia Bergström 6th (walked)
 Samir Badran 7th
 Ola-Conny Wallgren 8th
 Camilla Henemark 9th
 Ben Mitkus 10th

References

External links 
 
 

TV4 (Sweden) original programming
2018_Swedish_television_series_debuts
The Farm (franchise)